Cabrerizo is a Spanish language surname meaning "goatherd". It may refer to:

Bruno Cabrerizo (born 1979), Brazilian football player, model and actor
Cristian Cabrerizo (born 1993), better known as Cris Cab, American singer-songwriter and musician 
Natalia Cabrerizo (born 1980), Spanish swimmer

See also
Cabrerizos, a village and municipality in Castile-Leon, Spain